Caroline Lake Ingalls (née  Quiner (later Holbrook); December 12, 1839April 20, 1924) was an American schoolteacher who was the mother of Laura Ingalls Wilder, author of the Little House books.

Biography

Childhood

Caroline was born 15 miles west of Milwaukee, Wisconsin, in the Town of Brookfield, Waukesha County. She was the fifth of seven children of Henry and Charlotte Quiner. Her brothers were Joseph, Henry, and Thomas, and her sisters were Martha, Jane, and Eliza. (The Quiners' first child, Martha Morse Quiner, died in 1836.)

When Caroline was 5, her biological father died while serving as second mate on a ship that capsized and sank on Lake Michigan near the Straits of Mackinac. There were no survivors. In 1849, her mother married farmer Frederick Holbrook. They had one child together, Lottie Holbrook. Caroline evidently loved and respected her new father, and would later honor his memory by naming her son after him.  At the age of 16 1/2, Caroline started working as a teacher.

Marriage
On February 1, 1860, she married Charles Phillip Ingalls in Concord, Wisconsin. Together they had five children: Mary Amelia, Laura Elizabeth, Caroline Celestia (Carrie), Charles Frederick (Freddie), and Grace Pearl.

Freddie Ingalls

Charles Frederick "Freddie" Ingalls was born on November 1, 1875, in Walnut Grove, Minnesota, and died August 27, 1876, in South Troy, Minnesota, of indeterminate causes.

In her autobiography Pioneer Girl, Laura remembers that "Little Brother was not well" and that "one terrible day, he straightened out his little body and was dead". Wilder scholar William Anderson noted: "Nearly forty years after Freddie's death, Ma mourned him, telling relatives how different everything would be 'if Freddie had lived'."

Travels and later years
The Ingalls family traveled by covered wagon from Wisconsin; Kansas (Indian Territory); Burr Oak, Iowa; and Minnesota. In 1879, they settled in De Smet in Dakota Territory.  After arriving in De Smet, Caroline and the Ingalls family lived in the home of the local surveyor as well as a store in the downtown area, before homesteading just outside town on a farm by Silver Lake. When the Ingalls family sold the farm due to a persistent pattern of dry years, Charles built a home for them on Third Street in De Smet, known later as "The House That Pa Built". Following her husband's death from heart disease in 1902 at age 66, Ingalls and her oldest daughter, Mary, remained in the De Smet house, renting one of the rooms for extra income. Following a long illness, Caroline Ingalls died on April 20, 1924, at the age of 84.

In the media
The fictional series The Caroline Years, an extension of the Little House series, by Maria D. Wilkes and Celia Wilkins, follows Caroline Holbrook from her fifth year to her late teens, up to her engagement to Charles. The first title in the series is Little House in Brookfield.

The novel Caroline: Little House, Revisited by Sarah Miller follows the Ingalls family move from Pepin, Wisconsin to Kansas Territory from the viewpoint of Caroline. The novel was authorized by the Little House Heritage Trust.

References

External links
 Ma Ingalls describes family life in 1861, letter at the Wisconsin Historical Society

 
About the Ingalls Family (Sarah Uthoff)

1839 births
1924 deaths
19th-century American people
20th-century American people
19th-century American women
20th-century American women
Ingalls family
People from Redwood County, Minnesota
People from De Smet, South Dakota
People from Brookfield, Wisconsin
Schoolteachers from Wisconsin
American women educators
Schoolteachers from  South Dakota
Cowgirl Hall of Fame inductees